HMAS Canberra (L02) is the first ship of the Canberra-class landing helicopter dock in service with the Royal Australian Navy (RAN) and is the second largest in the Navy, succeeded by its sister ship . Construction of the ship started in Spain in 2008, with the hull launched by Navantia in 2011. The hull was then transported to Australia in late 2012 for completion by BAE Systems Australia. Canberra was commissioned on 28 November 2014.

Design

The Canberra class design is based on the warship Juan Carlos I, built by Navantia for the Spanish Navy. The contract was awarded to Navantia and Australian company Tenix Defence following a request for tender which ran from February 2004 to June 2007, beating the enlarged Mistral class design offered by French company Direction des Constructions Navales. Canberra has the same physical dimensions as Juan Carlos I, but differs in the design of the island superstructure and the internal layout, in order to meet Australian conditions and requirements. Unlike the Spanish vessel, the Australian ships are built to meet Lloyd's Naval Rules.

At full load, Canberra will displace . Propulsion is provided by two Siemens  azimuth thrusters, each with an onboard electric motor, driving two  diameter propellers. The electricity is provided by a Combined Diesel-electric and Gas (CODAG) system, with a single General Electric CM2500 gas turbine producing , supported by two MAN 16V32/40 diesel generators, each providing .

Each ship is fitted with a Saab 9LV Mark 4 combat management system. The sensor suite includes a Sea Giraffe 3D surveillance radar, and a Vampir NG infrared search and track system. For self-defence, the LHDs will be fitted with four Rafael Typhoon 25 mm remote weapons systems (one in each corner of the flight deck), six 12.7 mm machine guns, an AN/SLQ-25 Nixie towed torpedo decoy, and a Nulka missile decoy. Defence against aircraft and larger targets is to be provided by escort vessels and air support from the Royal Australian Air Force (RAAF). The ships' companies will consist of 358 personnel; 293 RAN, 62 Australian Army, and 3 RAAF.

The LHDs will transport 1,046 soldiers and their equipment. Canberra will be capable of deploying a reinforced company of up to 220 soldiers at a time by airlift. The well deck will carry up to four LHD Landing Craft (LLC), which can be launched and recovered in conditions up to Sea State 4. The flight deck can operate six MRH-90-size helicopters or four Chinook-size helicopters simultaneously, in conditions up to Sea State 5. A mix of MRH-90 transport helicopters and Sikorsky S-70B Seahawk anti-submarine helicopters will be carried: up to eight can be stored in the hangar deck, and the light vehicle deck can be repurposed to fit another ten. The ski-jump ramp of Juan Carlos I has been retained for the RAN ships, although fixed-wing flight operations are not planned for the ships.

Construction
Construction of Canberra began in September 2008, when the first steel was cut. The first three of 104 hull 'blocks' were laid down by Navantia at Ferrol in northern Spain on 23 September 2010. The hull was launched on 17 February 2011 by Vicki Coates, the widow of Rear Admiral Nigel Coates, a former commanding officer of the previous HMAS Canberra.

After the completion of the hull up to the level of the flight deck, Canberra was transported to Williamstown, Victoria. Canberras hull was floated onto the heavy-lift ship  on 4 August 2012, with Blue Marlin departing on 17 August. The heavy lift ship sailed via the Cape of Good Hope to avoid the risk of the ship and her cargo being hijacked by Somali pirates. The decision to avoid the shorter route via the Suez Canal and Horn of Africa was made because other options to protect Blue Marlin and Canberra were unworkable: the frigate  could not be diverted from anti-piracy duties in the region to provide a dedicated escort, and Dutch authorities objected to the presence of armed military or security personnel aboard the Dutch-flagged heavy lift ship. Canberra and Blue Marlin arrived in Port Phillip on 17 October. At Williamstown, the installation of Canberras island superstructure and the internal fitout of the hull was completed by BAE Systems Australia (which acquired Tenix in mid 2008).

The ship was officially christened on 15 February 2013. BAE continued to build the vessel in Williamstown, Victoria integrating C3 and sensors to the ship's superstructures. Canberra commenced sea trials on 3 March 2014, sailing under power for the first time. The trials program included a visit to Fleet Base East in Sydney for drydocking tests, before returning to Williamstown for communications and weapons testing. The first phase of the trials resulted in vibration damage to decking when the thruster pods were run independently at high speed (instead of in tandem, as designed), and a melted circuit breaker board when primary and emergency power systems were activated simultaneously, along with the discovery of a crack in the hull from the delivery voyage, and excessively corroded propeller nuts. The second phase of contractor-run sea trials began in July, after repairs were made, and had concluded by early September.

Canberra was handed over by BAE Systems to the Defence Materiel Organisation on 9 October 2014. The ship was commissioned on 28 November 2014 at Fleet Base East. Although identified as "LHD01" during construction, Canberra received the pennant number "L02" on commissioning; the pennant number corresponding to that used by the frigate of the same name.

Operational history

Canberra was the centrepiece of Australia Day celebrations in Sydney on 26 January 2015. In March 2015, the ship was designated the flagship of the RAN.

In February 2016, the ship was deployed from Fleet Base East initially to Brisbane in Queensland where it loaded a Royal Australian Army Engineer squadron and equipment including beach landing capabilities, water purification equipment and other essential engineering stores and then it sailed to Fiji on its first humanitarian mission after a tropical cyclone hit the country on February 20. The LHD was carrying 50 tonnes of humanitarian supplies including food, water, and medical equipment as well as more than 850 personnel from the Australian Defence Force. Embarked with the ship were three MRH-90 helicopters to support Australian operations. The Canberra joined other ADF assets to help with relief efforts.

Canberra formed part of the Australian force which participated in the RIMPAC 2016 exercise off Hawaii during mid-2016. During this deployment she successfully completed flight trials with United States military Sikorsky CH-53E Super Stallion and Bell Boeing V-22 Osprey aircraft.

In May 2017, issues with the vessel's azimuth thrusters were detected. Interim repairs were made.

In August 2020, three missing Micronesian sailors were found alive and well on Pikelot Island in Micronesia. Canberra dispatched a helicopter to provide food and water and check the men for injuries.

Canberra participated in RIMPAC 2022.

References

Citations

Sources 

 Journal articles and papers
 
 
 
 
 
 
 
 

 News articles
 
 
 
 
 
 
 
 
 
 
 
 
 
 
 

 Web and other sources

External link 
 

Canberra-class landing helicopter docks
2011 ships
Naval ships of Australia
Fleet Base East
Ships built in Spain